Phayeng is a small village in Imphal West district of Manipur, India.

India's first carbon-positive settlement 
Phayeng Village of Manipur has been tagged as the India's first carbon-positive settlement. As part of the carbon-positive village project, Phayeng will receive a grant of Rs10 crore in phases to facilitate afforestation in the catchment of river Maklang that flows along the village. The fund will also be utilised for creation of water bodies, introduction of climate change-resilient varieties of crops, installing solar lights, for setting up a community piggery and poultry farm, an eco-resort, replacing firewood in kitchen with cooking stoves and an indigenous knowledge centre in the village.

A village is given the Carbon-Positive Tag if it sequesters more carbon than it emits, slowing the accumulation of greenhouse gases and mitigating the effects of climate change. Phayeng is a scheduled caste village of the Chakpa community in Imphal West district and its conservation efforts are mainly linked to the belief that the forest is a sacred grove. It is surrounded by three densely forested hillocks with fruit trees at centre and a stream.

Environment friendly Community 
"We had no tree on these hills earlier. Our fathers had deforested them because of timber-related disputes. But villagers started realising that the area had become extremely warm; there was no water and people were falling ill. So villagers decided that the forest should be rejuvenated at any cost. Our umang kanba (forest protection committee) came up with various rules and involved all 660 families in the village in recreating the forest,” said Angom Gojendra, former village chief and a forest committee member.

References 

Villages in Imphal West district